Ahane or Ahagon (Kanji: 阿波根 or 亜波根) is a Ryukyuan surname. Notable people with the surname include:

 Ayano Ahane (亜波根 綾乃), Japanese singer

Fictional characters 

 Umiko Ahagon (阿波根うみこ), character in the anime series New Game!

See also 

 Okinawan name

Okinawan surnames
Japanese-language surnames
Surnames